The Progressive Caucus of the Illinois House of Representatives is a bloc of state legislators in the lower house of the Illinois General Assembly that was formed in 2019.

History 
Discussion about creating a progressive caucus first began in the Illinois House in early 2018, between representatives Will Guzzardi, Carol Ammons, and Theresa Mah. After the 2018 Illinois House of Representatives election, the three representatives pushed forward with their proposal. The caucus was formed and formally announced in February 2019, with 16 members. Their initially stated legislative priorities were a minimum wage increase, marijuana legalization, and campaign finance reform.

Membership

Current members

Former members

References

See also 

 Illinois Legislative Black Caucus
 Chicago City Council Progressive Reform Caucus

Progressive organizations in the United States
Issue-based groups of legislators
Illinois General Assembly